Gangloff may refer to:

People
 François Gangloff, a French gymnast and Olympic medalist
 Françoise Levechin-Gangloff, a French classical organist
 Gangulphus, an 8th-century French saint also known at St. Gangloff
 Hope Gangloff, an American painter
 Mark Gangloff, an American competition swimmer and Olympic medalist
 Steven Gangloff, MD, an American physician and cookbook author.

Places
 Gangloff (Becherbach), a village in the municipality of Becherbach in Rhineland-Palatinate, Germany
 Sankt Gangloff, a municipality in Thuringia, Germany

Other uses
 Gangloff AG, a Swiss builder of bodies for cable cars and other vehicles
 The Bugatti Gangloff, a virtual concept car